The Shared Belief Stakes (formerly the El Cajon Stakes) is an American Thoroughbred horse race run annually during the last week of August or the first week of September at Del Mar Racetrack in Del Mar, California. Open to three-year-old horses, the non-graded stakes is contested at a distance of one mile (8 furlongs) on the dirt. The purse is currently $100,000.

The race is named for champion Shared Belief, whose major wins included the 2014 Pacific Classic at Del Mar. It was previously named for the city of El Cajon, California.

Inaugurated in 1973, the race was run as a restricted overnight stakes until 2004. The distance was set at one and one eight miles in 1973 and 1974, then reduced to a mile and a sixteenth from 1975 through 1996 after which it was set at its current distance of one mile. From 2008 to 2015, the race was run on Polytrack synthetic dirt surface – all other renewals have been on a natural dirt surface.

The race was not run in 1994 and 2001.

Past winners

 2021 - Medina Spirit 
 2020 - Thousand Words
 2019 - Improbable
 2018 - Tatters To Riches
 2017 - Battle of Midway
 2016 - Accelerate
 2015 - Gimme Da Lute 
 2014 - Red Outlaw
 2013 - Holy Lute
 2012 - Fed Biz
 2011 - Celestic Night
 2010 - Haimish Way
 2009 - Grazen
 2008 - Slews Tiznow
 2007 - Rush with Thunder
 2006 - Cindago
 2005 - Follow the Rainbow
 2004 - Perfect Moon
 2003 - Excess Summer
 2002 - Joey Franco
 2001 - RACE NOT RUN
 2000 - Spicy Stuff
 1999 - National Saint
 1998 - Opine
 1997 - Best Star
 1996 - Ready to Order
 1995 - Turbulent Dancer
 1994 - RACE NOT RUN
 1993 - Pleasant Tango
 1992 - Slerp
 1991 - Letthebighossroll (California Champion sprinter)
 1990 - Asia
 1989 - Bruho
 1988 - Old Exclusive
 1987 - Sebrof
 1986 - Tasso (1985 American Champion Two-Year-Old Colt)
 1985 - Nostalgias Star
 1984 - Bunker
 1983 - Mamaison
 1982 - Craelius
 1981 - Island Whirl
 1980 - Mighty Return
 1979 - Shamgo
 1978 - Go West Young Man (Multiple Grade I winner)
 1977 - Kulak
 1976 - Wood Green
 1975 - Crumbs
 1974 - Within Hail
 1973 - Quick Bluff

References

 Nomination form for the Shared Belief, with entry requirements

Del Mar Racetrack
Horse races in California
Restricted stakes races in the United States
Flat horse races for three-year-olds
Recurring sporting events established in 1973
1973 establishments in California